The Ancient Catholic Metropolitan Archdiocese of Laureacum (Lorch) existed in what is now northern Upper Austria.

History 
When it was set up, Laureacum was in the 'Danubian' Roman Province of Noricum Ripensis.

Maximilian of Lorch is said to have been bishop of Laureacum.

The diocese was then abandoned for two centuries, in the face of pagan invasions. Lorch is near modern Linz.

Subsequently the diocese of Passau was set up, with a nearby see.

Titular see
It was nominally revived as a Metropolitan titular archbishopric in 1968 for its present incumbent, Girolamo Prigione (93), Apostolic Nuncio emeritus to Mexico.

References

External links
 GigaCatholic, with some incumbent biographies

Laureacum